James M. Taylor is president of The Heartland Institute, a conservative think tank founded in Illinois in 1984. Taylor received his bachelor's degree in government from Dartmouth College and his J.D. from Syracuse University. From 2001 to 2014, Taylor was the managing editor of the Heartland Institute-published Environment & Climate News.

References

External links

Dartmouth College alumni
Living people
Heartland Institute
Syracuse University College of Law alumni
American lawyers
Year of birth missing (living people)